Nekselø is a small Danish island in the Kattegat off the west coast of Zealand in the Bay of Sejrø. Nekselø has an area of 2.2 km2, 18 inhabitants and is part of Kalundborg Municipality. As of 1 January 2010, it has a population of 20.

Description 
Nekselø consists of an impressive row of hills which culminates at a height of 41 meters at Elmebjerg and Gadebjerg. The cliffs on the west coast are characterised by bushes shaped by the winds. On the east coast, there are coastal meadows and grasslands with woodlands in between, presenting a variety of tree species. The island is a popular venue for tourists. There are ferry connections to Havnsø on Zealand with a travel time of about 20 min. Cars are not allowed on the island.

Nature 
Because of its special nature, the entire island was listed in 1951. Human traffic is prohibited outside the official nature paths from 1 April to 15 July, when birds are breeding.

Gallery

See also
Sejerø
List of islands of Denmark

References

External links 

 Nekselø Official homepage of the residents association 

Islands of Denmark
Danish islands in Kattegat
Geography of Kalundborg Municipality